Ksenia Zsikhotska (sometimes romanised Zhikhotska; born 11 August 1989) is a Ukrainian dancer and choreographer. She is best known for her role as a professional dancer on Dancing with the Stars. She, alongside  professional partner, Ryan McShane, were the 2016 United Kingdom & British Latin Professional Champions & British Show Dance Champions.

Early life 
Zsikhotska was born in Ivano-Frankivsk, Ukraine. She started folk dancing at the age of four and took up ballroom when she moved to United Kingdom with her mother.

Career 
In 2015, Zsikhotska toured with Strictly Come Dancing professional Brendan Cole's A Night to Remember tour across the UK and Ireland.

In 2016, Zsikhotska and partner, Ryan McShane, were crowned United Kingdom & British Latin Professional Champions & British Show Dance Champions.

Television career

Got to Dance 

In 2013, Zsihotska took part in the Sky One dance competition show, Got to Dance alongside partner, Ryan McShane. They received three gold stars from the judges and advanced to the next round before being eliminated.

Britain's Got Talent (series 8) 
In 2014, Zsikhotska helped establish the ballroom dance group, Kings & Queens, alongside future Strictly Come Dancing professionals, Katya Jones and Neil Jones as well as her future Dancing with the Stars fellow professionals, Ryan McShane and Kai Widdrington on Britain's Got Talent. Kings & Queens reached the semi-finals of the series before being eliminated.

Dancing with the Stars Ireland 
In 2017, Zsikhotska was announced as one of the professional dancers for the first series of Dancing with the Stars. She was partnered with singer, Dayl Cronin. Cronin and Zsikhotska made it all the way to the semifinals of the competition before being eliminated and finishing in 4th place.

In 2018, Zsikhotska was partnered with RTÉ broadcaster, Marty Morrissey. Despite receiving low scores throughout their time on the show, the couple made it all the way to week 8 of the competition, finishing in seventh place.

In 2019, Zsikhotska was partnered with Ireland and Munster Rugby player, Peter Stringer. The couple made it to week 8 of the competition; marking the second year in a row that Zsikhotska finished in seventh place.

Highest and Lowest Scoring Per Dance

1 This score was awarded during Switch-Up Week.

Series 1 

 Celebrity partner
 Dayl Cronin; Average: 25.5; Place: 4th

Series 2 

 Celebrity partner
 Marty Morrissey; Average: 13.3; Place: 7th

Series 3

 Celebrity partner
Peter Stringer; Average: 18.6; Place: 7th

Personal life 
Zsikhotska and professional partner, Ryan McShane were in a relationship previously.

References 

1989 births
Living people
Ukrainian ballroom dancers
People from Ivano-Frankivsk